JCHS may refer to:
 Jefferson College of Health Sciences, Roanoke, Virginia, United States
 Joint Center for Housing Studies, at Harvard University

High schools 
 Jackson County High School, McKee, Kentucky, United States
 James Caldwell High School, West Caldwell, New Jersey, United States
 James Campbell High School, ʻEwa Beach, Hawaii, United States
 James Clemens High School, Madison, Alabama, United States
 James Cook High School, Auckland, New Zealand
 Jasper County High School (Georgia), Monticello, Georgia, United States
 Jay County High School, Portland Indiana, United States
 Jefferson City High School, Jefferson City, Missouri, United States
 Jefferson County High School (Georgia), Louisville, Georgia, United States
 Jenkins County High School, Millen, Georgia, United States
 Jersey Community High School, Jerseyville, Illinois, United States
 Jesse C. Carson High School, China Grove, North Carolina, United States
 Jewish Community High School of the Bay, San Francisco, California, United States
 Johns Creek High School, Johns Creek, Georgia, United States
 Johnson Central High School, Paintsville, Kentucky, United States
 Junction City High School (Arkansas), Junction City, Arkansas, United States
 Junction City High School (Oregon), Junction City, Oregon, United States